Mellow is an album by saxophonist Sonny Stitt recorded in 1975 and released on the Muse label.

Reception
Allmusic reviewed the album calling it "A good session of 1970s bop".

Track listing 
All compositions by Sonny Stitt except where noted.
 "A Sailboat in the Moonlight" (Carmen Lombardo, John Jacob Loeb) - 6:44   
 "If You Could See Me Now" (Tadd Dameron) - 5:00   
 "A Cute One" - 8:12   
 "I Should Care" (Axel Stordahl, Paul Weston, Sammy Cahn) - 5:43   
 "Soon" (George Gershwin, Ira Gershwin) - 3:40   
 "How High the Moon" (Nancy Hamilton, Morgan Lewis) - 6:30

Personnel 
Sonny Stitt - alto saxophone, tenor saxophone
Jimmy Heath - flute, soprano saxophone, tenor saxophone
Barry Harris - piano
Richard Davis - bass 
Roy Haynes - drums

References 

1975 albums
Muse Records albums
Sonny Stitt albums